The House of Lahovary (spelled in Romanian as Lahovari) is the name of an old Romanian aristocratic family. Throughout the centuries members of this family occupied many prominent positions in Wallachia and later in the Kingdom of Romania.

Notable members of the family

Gheorghe I. Lahovary, engineer and writer
Iacob Lahovary, politician who was the Minister of War and Minister of Foreign Affairs of Kingdom of Romania
Ioan Lahovary, politician who was the Minister of Foreign Affairs of Kingdom of Romania
Alexandru Lahovary, politician who was Minister of Justice, Minister of Agriculture, Industry, Trade and Property, Minister of Public Works and Minister of Foreign Affairs of Kingdom of Romania
Nicolae Lahovary, anthropologist and diplomat who was Minister plenipotentiary to Albania and Switzerland
Marthe Lucie Lahovary, princess, writer and daughter of Ioan Lahovary

Romanian-language surnames